Jalan Dato' Abu Bakar is a major road in Petaling Jaya city, Selangor, Malaysia.

List of junctions

Roads in Petaling Jaya